Ya'acov Shmuel (יעקב שמואל; born August 7, 1968) is an Israeli former Olympic boxer. He was undefeated in seven fights as a professional.

Personal life
When he competed, Shmuel was  5-6.5 (170 cm) tall, and weighed 126 lbs (57 kg). He was born in Israel, and is Jewish.

Boxing career
Shmuel competed for Israel at the 1988 Summer Olympics, boxing in the Men's Featherweight category, and came in tied for fifth.  He was 20 years of age. He received a bye in the first round, defeated John Mirona of Sudan in the second round (knocking out Mirona at 1:15 of the bout's first round), beat Richard Pittman of the Cook Islands in the third round, and lost to ultimate gold medalist Giovanni Parisi of Italy in the quarter-finals. 

He became a professional after the Olympics. Fighting as a professional from 1988 to 2000, Shmuel was undefeated at 7-0 in fights in Israel and France.

References

Living people
Featherweight boxers
Jewish boxers
Olympic boxers of Israel
1968 births
Israeli male boxers
Israeli Jews
Boxers at the 1988 Summer Olympics
20th-century Israeli people